|}

The International Stakes is a Group 3 flat horse race in Ireland open to thoroughbreds aged three years or older. It is run at the Curragh over a distance of 1 mile and 2 furlongs (2,012 metres), and it is scheduled to take place each year in late June or early July.

History
The event was originally held at Phoenix Park, and it was formerly known as the Whitehall Stakes. It was initially contested over 1 mile and 1 furlong, and for a period it was classed at Group 2 level. It was cut to 1 mile in 1986, and it was transferred to the Curragh in 1991.

The distance was extended by a furlong in 1999, and it reverted to its previous length in 2002. The race was restricted to three-year-olds in 2003, and it was downgraded to Group 3 status the following year. It was re-opened to older horses in 2006, and the race returned to 1 mile and 1 furlong in 2007. It was increased to 1 mile and 2 furlongs in 2010.

The International Stakes is currently held on the final day of the Curragh's three-day Irish Derby meeting.

Records

Most successful horse since 1950 (3 wins):
 Famous Name – 2009, 2011, 2012

Leading jockey since 1950 (6 wins):
 George McGrath – Ballyciptic (1965), Bluerullah (1966), Signa Infesta (1967), Lovely Kate (1970), Bog Road (1973, dead-heat), Furry Glen (1974)

Leading trainer since 1950 (11 wins):
 Vincent O'Brien – El Toro (1959), Onondaga (1969), Grenfall (1971), Nantequos (1976), Stradavinsky (1978), Muscovite (1980),  (1981), Punctilio (1982), Salmon Leap (1983), Fair Judgment (1987), Caerwent (1988)

Winners since 1980

Earlier winners

 1950: Eastern City
 1951: Evian
 1952: Solar
 1953: Prince of Fairfield
 1954: Coral Slipper
 1955: Tara
 1956: Beau Chevalet
 1957: Owenello
 1958: Jack Ketch
 1959: El Toro
 1960: Dante's Hope
 1961: Bally Vimy
 1962: Gay Challenger
 1963: Linacre
 1964: Deep Lavender
 1965: Ballyciptic
 1966: Bluerullah
 1967: Signa Infesta
 1968: Warren
 1969: Onondaga
 1970: Lovely Kate
 1971: Grenfall
 1972: Bunkered
 1973: Barclay Joy / Bog Road *
 1974: Furry Glen
 1975: Hurry Harriet
 1976: Nantequos
 1977: Aristocracy
 1978: Stradavinsky
 1979: Orchestra

* The 1973 race was a dead-heat and has joint winners.

See also
 Horse racing in Ireland
 List of Irish flat horse races

References
 Racing Post:

 galopp-sieger.de – International Stakes.
 horseracingintfed.com – International Federation of Horseracing Authorities – International Stakes (2018).
 irishracinggreats.com – International Stakes (Group 3).
 pedigreequery.com – International Stakes – Curragh.

Flat races in Ireland
Curragh Racecourse
Open middle distance horse races